Oscar Donahue is a former wide receiver in the National Football League. He played with the Minnesota Vikings during the 1962 NFL season.

References

1937 births
Living people
American football wide receivers
San Jose State Spartans football players
Minnesota Vikings players